Outspoken is the second studio album from Minnesota-based band For All Those Sleeping, released through Fearless Records on June 19, 2012, nearly two years after their debut album Cross Your Fingers. The album showcases a much heavier metalcore sound with more prominent usage of unclean vocals and limited use of pop punk style choruses which were featured regularly on the aforementioned debut. Similarly to the first album, this album was also produced by Cameron Mizell.

On April 25, 2012, the band released the first single off the album, "Mark My Words", as a digital download on iTunes.

The album debuted at number 95 on the Billboard 200, selling over 4000 copies in its first week.

Track listing

Chart performance

Personnel 
 Mike Champa - Unclean Vocals, Lead Vocals on tracks 1,6,9
 Jerad Pierskalla - Rhythm guitar, backing unclean vocals
 David Volgman-Stevens - Lead guitar, Keyboards
 Ethan Trekell - Drums
 London Snetsinger - Bass, clean vocals

Production
Cameron Mizell - Production, engineering, Mixing
 Alan Douches - Mastering
 Justin Reich - Artwork, Layout, Photography
 Drew Fulk - Pre-Production

References 

Fearless Records albums
2012 albums
For All Those Sleeping albums